Chemerin peptides are short peptides (on the order of 9 amino acids) that are produced from the carboxyl terminus of the chemokine chemerin. They display the same activities as chemerin, although at higher efficacy and potency.

A particular synthetic chemerin-derived peptide, termed C15, was developed at Oxford University. It showed anti-inflammatory activities. Intraperitoneal administration of C15 (0.32 ng/kg) to mice before zymosan challenge conferred significant protection against zymosan-induced peritonitis, suppressing neutrophil (63%) and monocyte (62%) recruitment with a concomitant reduction in proinflammatory mediator expression.

C15 was found to promote phagocytosis and efferocytosis in peritoneal macrophages at picomolar concentrations. C15 enhanced macrophage clearance of microbial particles and apoptotic cells by factor of 360% in vitro

References

See also
Chemerin
CMKLR1
Chemokine
Efferocytosis